Baori may refer to:

 a stepwell (in India and Pakistan), as baori is one of the Hindi and Urdu terms for a stepwell

Places 
A number of places in Pakistan and India have been named baori after their step-wells:
 Baori, Bawadi, a panchayat town and taluka headquarters in Jodhpur District, Rajasthan, India

See also 
 Baoris and Baorini, a genus and tribe of skipper butterflies